Susan Jean Elisabeth "Zanny" Minton Beddoes (born July 1967) is a British journalist. She is the editor-in-chief of The Economist, the first woman to hold the position. She began working for the magazine in 1994 as its emerging markets correspondent.

Education and early life 
Born in Shropshire, Minton Beddoes was educated at Moreton Hall School near Oswestry, received a Bachelor of Arts degree at the University of Oxford, where she studied Philosophy, Politics and Economics (PPE) as an undergraduate student of St Hilda's College, Oxford. She earned a master's degree at Harvard University as a Kennedy Scholar from 1989-1990, and had the scholarship fully renewed for an additional year.

Career
After graduation, she was recruited as an adviser to the Minister of Finance in Poland, in 1992, as part of a small group headed by Professor Jeffrey Sachs of Harvard. She then spent two years as an economist at the International Monetary Fund (IMF), where she worked on macroeconomic adjustment programmes in Africa and the transition economies of Central and Eastern Europe.

Through this work, she joined The Economist in 1994 as the newspaper's correspondent for emerging markets, based in London. She became the Economics editor in 1996, overseeing global economics coverage from Washington DC, and later moved to Business Affairs editor, responsible for business, finance and science. She began as the 17th and first female editor-in-chief on 2 February 2015.

Secured by her appointment to the top editor position at The Economist, Minton Beddoes was described by the 2015 edition of Debrett's 500 as "one of the most influential voices in financial journalism". She has written surveys of the world economy, Latin American finance, global finance and Central Asia. She has written extensively about the American economy and international financial policy; the enlargement of the European Union; the future of the IMF; and economic reform in emerging economies. She has been published in Foreign Affairs and Foreign Policy, contributed chapters to several conference volumes, and edited Emerging Asia (Asian Development Bank, 1997), a book on the future of emerging-markets in Asia.

In May 1998, she provided expert testimony on the introduction of the Euro to the United States House Financial Services Subcommittee on International Monetary Policy and Trade, a subcommittee of the House Committee on Financial Services.

In 2010, Minton Beddoes spoke at Princeton University with Peter Orszag, Director of the Office of Management and Budget, and Professor Alan Blinder, Chair of the Center for Economic Policy Studies at Princeton. Their discussion was called "How Did We Get Into this Mortgage Mess, and How Do We Get Out?" In 2012, she gave the 28th Annual Max Rosenn Lecture on "Stress-Testing America's Prosperity". Minton Beddoes is a regular commentator on Marketplace and other public radio programmes. She has also appeared on CNN, the BBC World Service, Charlie Rose, PBS NewsHour, CNBC, NBC and Real Time with Bill Maher.

She is a trustee of the Carnegie Endowment for International Peace and a member of the Research Advisory Board of the Committee for Economic Development.

In 2015, Minton Beddoes was one of 133 invitees to the 63rd Bilderberg conference, an invitation-only meeting of top business leaders, politicians, academics and royalty, for an informal and secret discussion of world issues.

Awards

 2012 Gerald Loeb Award for Commentary
 2017 Gerald Loeb Award for Breaking News

Personal life 
Minton Beddoes, the eldest daughter of a former British army officer and his German-born wife, was born Susan Jean Elisabeth, and later acquired the nickname Zanny. She is married to British-born journalist and author Sebastian Mallaby. They have four children.

References 

1967 births
Living people
People educated at Moreton Hall School
Alumni of St Hilda's College, Oxford
Harvard University alumni
Kennedy Scholarships
British business and financial journalists
British women journalists
British development economists
International finance economists
The Economist editors
Mallaby family
Women business and financial journalists
Gerald Loeb Award winners for Columns, Commentary, and Editorials
Gerald Loeb Award winners for Breaking News